Malgré Tout is an 1898 sculpture by Jesús Fructuoso Contreras, depicting a nude woman lying down struggling against chains to rise. 

There are copies in the Museo Nacional de Arte and the Alameda Central, in Mexico City, as well as the Aguascalientes Museum in Aguascalientes, Mexico. 

The name "Malgré Tout" is French for "nevertheless" or "in spite of everything". The sculptor created it after losing his right arm.

Museo Nacional de Arte
The Museo Nacional de Arte has a marble version.

Alameda Central

Alameda Central has a copy of the sculpture. Contreras' statue Désespoir is also displayed in the park. This was where the original marble sculpture was first displayed before it was moved to the museum.

Museo Aguascalientes 

The Aguascalientes Museum also has a copy of the sculpture.

References

External links

 
  In Spite Of Losing His Right Arm, Jesús F. Contreras Designed One Of The Best Sculptures in Mexico

Alameda Central
Nude sculptures
Outdoor sculptures in Mexico City
Sculptures of women in Mexico
Statues in Mexico